XTE J1550-564, sometimes abbreviated to J1550 and also known as V381 Normae, is a low-mass X-ray binary in the constellation Norma. It is composed of a black hole around 10 times as massive as the Sun, and a star of spectral type K3III. The black hole fires out jets of matter that are thought to arise from an accretion disk, and is hence known as a microquasar.

References

Norma (constellation)
Normae, V381
X-ray binaries